F-117 is the Lockheed F-117 Nighthawk, an American stealth attack aircraft.

F-117 or F117 may also refer to:

 Pratt & Whitney PW2000 (military designation F117), a turbofan aero engine
 , a British Royal Navy Tribal-class frigate
 , a British Royal Navy Maracaibo-class LST Mk.I tank landing ship 
 F-117A Nighthawk Stealth Fighter 2.0, videogame for the IBM PC from MicroProse (1991)
 F-117A Stealth Fighter, videogame for the NES from MicroProse (1992)

See also

 F-117 Night Storm, videogame for the Sega Genesis / Mega Drive from Electronic Arts (1993)